"Love's About to Change My Heart" is the third single from Another Place and Time, the 1989 album by Donna Summer. The song was released on August 14, 1989 by Atlantic Records and Warner Bros. Records. It was written and produced by British production team Stock Aitken & Waterman. Released as the second single in the US, the song was another commercial failure for Summer in the US.

Critical reception
Pop Rescue stated that "Love's About to Change My Heart" "opens sounding a bit like a Whitney Houston 80s song, before absolutely roaring into a hi-NRG bass/keyboards/beats track", and added positively that "Donna's vocals sit confidently on top of this, and at times it gives a wonderful nod to her disco era". In 2021, British magazine Classic Pop ranked the song number 24 in their list of 'Top 40 Stock Aitken Waterman songs', calling it a "sumptuous" single from Another Place and Time and expressing sadeness about its commercial failure in the United States.

Chart performance
In US, "Love's About to Change My Heart" peaked at number 85 on Billboards Hot 100. Despite the lack of chart success in the US, it was a solid top 20 hit in the UK and it became a favorite among Donna Summer fans due to her strong vocal performance and the fact that it had a slow beginning, reminiscent of several of Summer's disco hits of the 1970s, during which time she was the most successful female of that genre.

The song was remixed from its original album version for release as a single. Notably the European single remix was different from the one found in the U.S. It reached number three on the U.S. Dance Chart and number 20 on the UK Singles Chart. The video was directed by Dieter Trattmann.

Cover versions
The song was covered by Spanish singer Mónica Naranjo in her debut album. She made a Spanish-language version called "Fuego de Passion".

Track listings
 UK 7" single
 "Love's About to Change My Heart (Edit)" - 3:47
 "Love's About to Change My Heart (Instrumental)" - 3:47

 UK 12" single / UK CD
 "Love's About to Change My Heart (Extended Remix)" – 6:23
 "Love's About to Change My Heart (Instrumental)" – 5:10
 "Jeremy" - 4:40

 UK second 12" single
 "Love's About to Change My Heart (Clivilles & Cole 12" Mix)" – 7:40 
 "Love's About to Change My Heart (Dub 2)" – 7:10
 "Love's About to Change My Heart (Clivilles & Cole 7" Mix)" – 4:20

US 12" single (Atlantic 0-86309)
 "Love's About to Change My Heart (PWL 12" Mix)" - 6:23
 "Love's About to Change My Heart (PWL 7" Mix)" - 3:45
 "Love's About to Change My Heart (Clivillés & Cole 12" Mix)" - 7:40
 "Love's About to Change My Heart (Dub)" - 7:10
 "Love's About to Change My Heart (Clivillés & Cole 7" Mix)" - 4:20

Charts

References

1989 singles
Donna Summer songs
Song recordings produced by Stock Aitken Waterman
Songs written by Mike Stock (musician)
Songs written by Matt Aitken
Songs written by Pete Waterman
1989 songs
Dance-pop songs
Warner Records singles
Atlantic Records singles